The 1960–61 Kansas Jayhawks men's basketball team represented the University of Kansas during the 1960–61 college men's basketball season.

Roster
Wayne Hightower
Bill Bridges
Jerry Gardner
Nolen Ellison
Al Correll
Dee Ketchum
Butch Ellison
Ralph Heyward
Jim Dumas
Carl Deane
John Matt
Grover Marshall
Pete Woodward
John Williams
Bob Frederick
Larry Sterlin

Schedule

References

Kansas Jayhawks men's basketball seasons
Kansas
Kansas
Kansas